Special Olympics Pakistan is an officially recognized program of Special Olympics International which operates in Pakistan as not-for-profit organization and works with intellectually disabled individuals and help them through participation in sports.

History 
Special Olympics is an international nonprofit organization dedicated to empowering individuals with intellectual disabilities to become fit, productive and respected members of the society through sports training and competition. Founded in 1968 by Eunice Kennedy Shriver, Special Olympics provides year-round sports training and competition to 2.5 million adults and children with intellectual disabilities across 180 countries. 

Special Olympics Pakistan was established 1989 with around 20 registered athletes. The organization now has over 28,500 registered athletes, over 750 coaches and over 3,000 volunteers with more than 320 competitions held by 2018.

Sports 
Special Olympics Pakistan provides sports training and held Olympic styple competitions in 11 summer sports and 3 winter sports.

Summer Sports 
 Aquatics
 Athletics
 Badminton
 Basketball
 Cricket
 Football
 Cycling
 Power-lifting
 Tennis
 Table Tennis
 Bocce

Winter Sports 
 Cross-country skiing
 Floorball
 Snowshoeing

Oath 
Let me win- but if I cannot win, let me be brave in the attempt.

Support 
Annual Fundraising Gala is held and is one of the main sources of income along with donations and sponsorships.

International Events participated in 
 -Summer World Games 1991-Minnesota USA-16 Athletes.
 -World Games 1995- Connecticut, USA-26 Athletes.
 -First Asia Pacific Games 1996- Shanghai, China- 14 athletes.
 -World Games 1999- North Carolina, USA- 40 athletes.
 -World Games 2003- Dublin, Ireland -60 athletes.
 -Asia Pacific Cricket Tournament 2004- Ahmedabad, India- 14 athletes.
 -Ludhiana Games 2005- Ludhiana India- 46 athletes.
 -Delhi Games 2005- Delhi, India- 10 athletes.
 -China Invitation Games 2006- Shanghai, China- 10 athletes.
 -Special Olympics Cricket World Cup Tournament 2006- Mumbai, India- 44 athletes.
 -Special Olympics World Summer Game in Shanghai China 2007- 65 athletes.
 -Asia Pacific Bocce Competition 2008, Brunei Darussalam- 4 Athletes.
 -Ludhiana Games 2008- Ludhiana, India- 35 athletes.
 -Special Olympics Bharat International Cricket Carnival in Delhi, India 2009-14 athletes.
 -Special Olympics World Summer Games Athens, Greece 2011- 58 Athletes.
 -Special Olympics Asia Pacific Games; Newcastle, Australia 2013 -59 Athletes.
 -Special Olympics Asia Pacific Qualified of the 2014 Football Unified Cup, Bangkok Thailand 21 Athletes.

See also 
 National Paralympic Committee of Pakistan
 Pakistan at the Paralympics

External Links 
 Official website

References

Special Olympics
Sport in Pakistan
Parasports organisations in Pakistan